Microsat-TD was an Earth observing satellite developed by ISRO. Its launch marked India's 100 satellites in space. This satellite could capture images at night by imaging in infrared spectrum.

Launch
MICROSAT-TD satellite was launched at 0359 UTC on 12 January 2018 by PSLV-C40 and its deployment profile was previously rehearsed on PSLV-C38 mission.  Microsat-TD was launched along with Cartosat-2F, INS-1C and 28 satellites from 6 countries and separated 1 hour 45 minutes after first stage ignition. Duration of PSLV C40 mission was 2 hours and 21 minutes, making it the longest mission of PSLV at that time.

Payload 
Microsat-TD was IMS-1 based technology demonstrator carrying optical imaging payload in two bands.

 0.8 meter resolution (panchromatic, 0.5 -0.85 µm) with 3.2 km swath 
 6 meter resolution (IR,3.7-4.8 µm and 8-12 µm) with 2 km swath

End of mission

To reduce its orbital stay, Microsat-TD was de-orbited while depleting its left over propellant near the end of its life. Satellite reentered within a month, on 27 November 2020.

See also
Microsat-R

References

External links 
 

Earth observation satellites of India
Spacecraft launched by India in 2018
Small satellites
Spacecraft launched by PSLV rockets